The P.M.R.C. Can Suck on This is an EP by the American punk rock band NOFX. It was originally released in 1987 through Wassail Records with hand-written labels (limited to 500 copies) and was re-released on January 1, 1990, through Fat Wreck Chords. The original version of the EP featured a black-and-white photo montage of Tammy Faye Bakker pegging then-husband (and televangelist) Jim Bakker as its cover, but was eventually changed to a picture of guitarist Eric Melvin playing on stage. The track "Shut Up Already" borrows a riff from the Led Zeppelin song "Living Loving Maid", while the Liberal Animation version ended with a riff from "Black Dog". All the tracks were compiled on the Longest EP compilation as tracks 26-30 respectively, where Johnny B. Goode appears at the end of "The Punk Song".

Track listing

Side A
"Dueling Retards" (previously unreleased) (0:15)
"On the Rag" (slightly different from the Liberal Animation version, lower quality recording) (1:51)
"A200 Club" (slightly different from the Liberal Animation version, with extra lyrics) (2:00)

Side B
"Shut Up Already" (slightly different from the Liberal Animation version) (2:26)
"The Punk Song" (previously unreleased) (1:06)
"Johnny B. Goode" (originally performed by Chuck Berry) (2:02)

Personnel
Fat Mike - vocals, bass
Eric Melvin - guitar
Dave Cassilas - guitar
Erik Sandin - drums

References

1987 EPs
NOFX EPs
Fat Wreck Chords EPs